Psydrax kibuwae is a species of flowering plant in the family Rubiaceae. It is endemic to Tanzania.

References

kibuwae
Flora of Tanzania
Vulnerable plants
Taxonomy articles created by Polbot
Taxa named by Diane Mary Bridson